Ferencszállás is a village in the Szeged District of Csongrád county, in the Southern Great Plain region of southern Hungary.

Geography
The village is accessible via Hungary's Highway 43. The town lies along the river Maros, 10.5 kilometers west of Makó.

History 
The village of Ferencszállás was founded in 1828 by the Hungarian baron Gerliczy Ferenc, from whom its name derives. Ferencszállás is located on a plain once known as Kukutyin puszta, which was the site of tobacco drying barns between 1810 and 1814.

References

Populated places in Csongrád-Csanád County